General elections were held in Bolivia on 11 November 1934, electing both a new President of the Republic and a new National Congress, but the results were later nullified. The terms of Senators and Deputies (elected in 1933) then in office were prorogued to 5 August 1936, by Act of National Congress on 4 August 1935.

Results

President

References

Elections in Bolivia
Bolivia
Legislative election
Presidential elections in Bolivia
November 1934 events
Annulled elections
Election and referendum articles with incomplete results